This is a list of singers from Finland.

A

 Saara Aalto
 Anneli Aarika-Szrok
 Pekka Aarnio
 Jonne Aaron
 Armi Aavikko
 Anna Abreu
 Pepe Ahlqvist
 Jarkko Ahola
 Siru Airistola
 Ilkka Alanko
 Ismo Alanko
 Mikko Alatalo
 Nikolai Alho
 ALMA
 Nikke Ankara
 Marko Annala
 Markku Aro
 Koop Arponen
 Asa (a.k.a. Avain / Asa Masa)
 Ami Aspelund
 Monica Aspelund
 Sampsa Astala
 Aste

B

 Sammy Babitzin
 Tuure Boelius
 Antti Boman
 Kristiina Brask
 Brädi

C

 Carita
 Cheek
 Chisu
 Jussi Chydenius
 Kaj Chydenius
 Jimi Constantine

D

 Daco Junior
 Danny
 Diandra

E

 Samuli Edelmann
 Eevil Stöö
 Elastinen
 Isac Elliot
 Kike Elomaa
 Emmi
 Erin
 Anna Eriksson
 Evelina
 Ezkimo

F

 Frederik
 Fredi
 Freeman
 Janina Frostell

G

 Mikael Gabriel
 Gettomasa
 Irwin Goodman
 Hanna Granfelt
 Eino Grön
 Mäk Gälis

H

 Anna Hanski
 Susanna Haavisto
 Joel Hallikainen
 Tony Halme
 Pauli Hanhiniemi
 Costello Hautamäki
 Hector
 Heikki Hela
 Reino Helismaa
 Barbara Helsingius
 Mikko Herranen
 Marko Hietala
 Konsta Hietanen
 Vuokko Hovatta
 Maarit Hurmerinta
 Jouni Hynynen
 Elias Hämäläinen

I

 OG Ikonen
 Irina
 Islaja

J

 Jenni Jaakkola
 Janita
 Janna
 Jannika B
 Jippu
 Vesa "Vesku" Jokinen
 Jonsu
 Juju
 Jukka Poika
 Julma-Henri
 Erkki Junkkarinen
 Juno
 Ilkka Jääskeläinen

K

 Jesse Kaikuranta
 Tony Kakko
 Ile Kallio
 Tapani Kansa
 Kari Tapio
 J. Karjalainen
 Pernilla Karlsson
 Karri Koira
 Kasmir
 Katri Helena
 Tuomas Kauhanen
 Anssi Kela
 Kikka
 Tuure Kilpeläinen
 Laila Kinnunen
 Kirka
 Viktor Klimenko
 Ari Koivunen
 Brita Koivunen
 Kojo
 Pekka Kokko
 Terhi Kokkonen
 Kaija Koo
 Kaisa Korhonen
 Kerkko Koskinen
 Pasi Koskinen
 Timo Kotipelto
 Kube
 Kari Kuivalainen
 Kuningas Pähkinä
 Jukka Kuoppamäki
 Sakari Kuosmanen
 Johanna Kurkela
 Sanni Kurkisuo
 Sanna Kurki-Suonio
 Heikki Kuula
 Mauno Kuusisto
 Mikko Kuustonen
 Juha Kylmanen
 Kaija Kärkinen

L

 Alexi Laiho
 Ville Laihiala
 Lau Nau
 Lea Laven
 Veikko Lavi
 Ville Leinonen
 Mikko Leppilampi
 Päivi Lepistö
 Juice Leskinen
 Tommi Liimatta
 Dave Lindholm
 Olli Lindholm
 Petri Lindroos
 Kalle Lindroth
 Jyrki Linnankivi
 Vesa-Matti Loiri
 Erja Lyytinen
 Tommi Läntinen

M

 Maarit
 Georg Malmstén
 Pirkko Mannola
 Eeki Mantere (aka. Viktor Kalborrek)
 Mariska
 Jarkko Martikainen
 Andy McCoy
 Juha Metsäperä
 Miisa
 Matthau Mikojan
 Pelle Miljoona
 Michael Monroe
 Muska
 Musta Barbaari
 Pate Mustajärvi
 Lasse Mårtenson
 Jari Mäenpää
 Taneli Mäkelä

N

 Pertti Neumann
 Nopsajalka
 Matti Nykänen
 Laura Närhi
 Reino Nordin
 Siiri Nordin
 M. A. Numminen
 Sara Nunes
 Petri Nygård

P

 Lilli Paasikivi
 Robin Packalen
 Hanna Pakarinen
 Paleface
 Tauno Palo
 Paperi T
 Paradise Oskar
 Pete Parkkonen
 Paska
 Päivi Paunu
 Leena Peisa
 Kari Peitsamo
 Matti Pellonpää
 Maukka Perusjätkä
 Pirkka-Pekka Petelius
 Jaani Peuhu
 PistePiste
 Viivi Pumpanen
 Tomi Putaansuu
 Samuli Putro
 Anna Puu
 Pyhimys

R

 Raappana
 Antti Railio
 Mari Rantasila
 Tapio Rautavaara
 Timo Rautiainen
 Redrama
 Ronya
 RoopeK
 Vicky Rosti
 Marion Rung
 Jope Ruonansuu
 Ruudolf
 Kauko Röyhkä

S

 Marko Saaresto
 Sami Saari
 Wimme Saari
 Anneli Saaristo
 Sini Sabotage
 Arja Saijonmaa
 Tuomo Saikkonen
 Simo Salminen
 Hiski Salomaa
 Sandhja
 Sipe Santapukki
 Ninja Sarasalo
 Pete Seppälä
 Krista Siegfrids
 Jari Sillanpää
 Heikki Silvennoinen
 Laura Sippola
 Aki Sirkesalo
 Axl Smith
 Cristal Snow
 Sinikka Sokka
 Kyllikki Solanterä
 Rauli "Badding" Somerjoki
 Riki Sorsa
 Topi Sorsakoski
 Spekti
 Steen1
 Jan Stenfors
 Pekka Streng
 Martti Suosalo
 Meiju Suvas
 Astrid Swan
 Jussi Sydänmaa

T

 Reijo Taipale
 Juha Tapio
 Nina Tapio
 Liisa Tavi
 Jonna Tervomaa
 Suvi Teräsniska
 Henry Theel
 Timo Tolkki
 Antti Tuisku
 Tuomari Nurmio
 Tuomo
 Tarja Turunen
 Lauri Tähkä

U

 Uniikki
 Olavi Uusivirta

V

 Juha "Watt" Vainio
 Ville Valo
 Jontte Valosaari
 Mato Valtonen
 Jenni Vartiainen
 Paula Vesala
 Kaarle Viikate
 Maija Vilkkumaa
 Olavi Virta
 Jukka Virtanen
 Veltto Virtanen
 Laura Voutilainen

W

 Leif Wager
 Mirel Wagner
 Jalo Walamies
 Kristiina Wheeler
 Pepe Willberg
 Tapio Wilska
 Toni Wirtanen
 Arttu Wiskari
 Essi Wuorela

Y

 Yasmine Yamajako
 Katri Ylander
 Lauri Ylönen

Å

 Nina Åström

See also 
 List of bands from Finland
 List of Finnish musicians
 List of Finnish jazz musicians

 
Finnish
Singers